Government College Peshawar is public sector college located in Zaryab Colony, Faqirabad, Peshawar Khyber Pakhtunkhwa, Pakistan. The college offers programs for intermediate level both in Arts and Science groups, which are affiliated with Board of Intermediate and Secondary Education Peshawar. The college also offers 2 years BA & BSc programs plus 4 years BS programs in various disciplines, which are affiliated with University of Peshawar.

Overview and history 
Government College Peshawar is one of the most renowned colleges in Peshawar city. The college was established in June 1959. The college was relocated to its present location in 1961 prior to that it was functioning in the Provincial Assembly building for 4 years. The college building spreads over an area of around 40 Kanals and is located next to historic Shahi Bagh.

Vision 
To be a forward looking centre for quality education where all the stakeholders have open opportunities of discourse and wisdom. To equip the students’ community with a range of practices to identify, create and distribute knowledge and skills in their chosen stream thereby infusing emotional investment in the shape of values. To shape the learners into future leaders and entrepreneurs in diverse fields and above all into good human beings.

Departments and faculties 
The college currently has the following departments and faculties.

Faculty of Humanities 
The main departments of humanities faculty are Arabic & Islamiyat, Economics, English, Health & Physical Education, History, Law, Library Science, Pakistan Studies, Pashto, Political Science and Urdu.

Faculty of Biological Sciences 
There are currently three departments in Biological Sciences faculty: Geography, Botany and Zoology.

Faculty of Physical Sciences 
The main departments of physical sciences faculty are Chemistry, Computer Science, Maths, Physics and Statistics.

Academic programs 
The college currently offers the following programs.

Intermediate
Currently the college has 2 years intermediate programs in FSc: Pre-Medical, Pre-Engineering and Computer Science while FA in General Science and Humanities.

Degree Level (2 years)
The college currently offers 2 years Degree level programs in BA (Humanities) and BSc (General Sciences and Computer Sciences).

BS Degrees (4 years)
The college currently offers 4 years BS programs in Computer Science, Economics, Physics, Chemistry, Botany, Zoology, Mathematics, Urdu, Geography, English, Statistics, Islamiyat.

Sporting Activities 
Government College Peshawar is actively participating in sports activities besides education. The college cricket team won the 2016 BISE, Peshawar cricket tournament played between 24 teams of schools and colleges affiliated with BISE, Peshawar. In 2017, KP Inter-Divisional games were held in the college in which around 200 players from Peshawar, Mardan, Kohat, Malakand, Bannu, Dera Ismail Khan and Hazara divisions participated in the sports gala.

See also 
 Edwardes College Peshawar
 Islamia College Peshawar
 Government College Peshawar
 Government Superior Science College Peshawar
 Government College Hayatabad Peshawar
 Government Degree College Naguman Peshawar
 Government Degree College Mathra Peshawar
 Government Degree College Badaber Peshawar
 Government Degree College Chagarmatti Peshawar
 Government Degree College Wadpagga Peshawar
 Government Degree College Achyni Payan Peshawar

References

External links 
 Government College Peshawar Official Website

Colleges in Peshawar
Universities and colleges in Peshawar